The 1998 Pilot Pen International was a tennis tournament played on outdoor hard courts at the Cullman-Heyman Tennis Center in New Haven, Connecticut, in the United States that was part of the International Series Gold of the 1998 ATP Tour and of Tier II of the 1998 WTA Tour. The men's tournament was held from August 17 through August 23, 1998, while the women's tournament was held from August 24 through August 30, 1998.

Seeds
Champion seeds are indicated in bold text while text in italics indicates the round in which those seeds were eliminated.

Draw

Finals

Top half

Bottom half

References

External links
 ATP draw

Pilot Pen International – Men's Doubles
Men's Doubles
Volvo International